Mahapurana may refer to:

Mahapurana (Hinduism), the 18 Great Puranas of Hindu belief
Mahapurana (Jainism), a major Jain text by Jinasena